Adhemar François Bultheel (born 1948) is a Belgian mathematician and computer scientist, the former president of the Belgian Mathematical Society. He is a prolific book reviewer for the Bulletin of the Belgian Mathematical Society and for the European Mathematical Society. His research concerns approximation theory.

Education and career
Bultheel was born in Zwijndrecht, Belgium on December 14, 1948. He earned a licenciate in mathematics in 1970 and another in industrial mathematics in 1971, both from KU Leuven. He remained at KU Leuven for a bachelor's degree in 1975 and a PhD in mathematics in 1979. His dissertation, Recursive Rational Approximation, was jointly supervised by Patrick M. Dewilde and Hugo Van de Vel.

Except for a year of military service, he was employed at KU Leuven for his entire career, retiring as a professor emeritus of computer science in 2009. He was president of the Belgian Mathematical Society for 2002–2005.

Books
Bultheel is the author of:
Laurent Series and their Padé Approximations (Operator Theory: Advances and Applications 27, Birkhäuser, 1987)
Linear Algebra, Rational Approximation and Orthogonal Polynomials (with Marc van Barel, Studies in Computational Mathematics 6, North-Holland, 1997)
Orthogonal Rational Functions (with Pablo González-Vera, Erik Hendriksen, and Olav Njåstad, Cambridge Monographs on Applied and Computational Mathematics 5, Cambridge University Press, 1999)
''Inleiding tot de numerieke wiskunde (Acco, 2006)

References

External links
Home page

1948 births
Living people
Belgian computer scientists
Belgian mathematicians
KU Leuven alumni
Academic staff of KU Leuven